George Boyer Vashon (July 25, 1824 – October 5, 1878) was an African American scholar, poet, lawyer, and abolitionist.

Biography 
George Boyer Vashon was born in Carlisle, Pennsylvania, the third child and only son of an abolitionist, John Bethune Vashon (or John Bathan Vashon). In 1840, at age 16, he enrolled in Oberlin Collegiate Institute (later Oberlin College), and in 1844 he became its first African-American graduate, and the valedictorian of his class.

Vashon was the first practicing African-American lawyer in New York State, but was denied the right to practice in Pennsylvania because of his "race", first in 1847 and again in 1868. According to Judge Thomas Mellon, "The teachings of history and physiology clearly establish the fact that social equality and connection between the races in the domestic relations can only be productive of evil—shortening life and weakening the physical and mental condition, as a general rule." He proposed that there be a separate territory for Blacks in the United States where they could vote, practice law, and serve on juries, but not in Pennsylvania.

Using the same credentials, Vashon was the following week admitted to practice before the U.S. Supreme Court.

In 1853, he was a prominent attendee of the radical abolitionist National African American Convention in Rochester, New York. His was one of five names attached to the address of the convention to the people of the United States published under the title, The Claims of Our Common Cause, along with Frederick Douglass, James Monroe Whitfield, Henry O. Wagoner, and Amos Noë Freeman. In 1853 he joined the faculty of New York Central College, near Cortland, New York, as a replacement for exiled William G. Allen. In 1857, he married Susan Paul Vashon. In the 1870s he lived and worked for a time in Washington, D.C., where he also taught young African Americans at a night school there.

Vashon High School, in St. Louis, Missouri, is named for Vashon and his son, John Boyer Vashon.

In 2010, 163 years after he applied, the Pennsylvania Bar admitted him.

See also
List of first minority male lawyers and judges in New York

References

Further reading

External links
 Picture of Vashon, property of McGraw Historical Society

1824 births
1878 deaths
Oberlin College alumni
19th-century African-American academics
New York Central College faculty
African-American abolitionists
People from Washington, D.C.
People from Carlisle, Pennsylvania
African-American college graduates before 1865
19th-century American lawyers
African-American lawyers
New York (state) lawyers
Pennsylvania lawyers
Racial segregation